Burny is a  of the Soviet and later Russian navy.

Development and design 

The project began in the late 1960s when it was becoming obvious in the Soviet Navy that naval guns still had an important role particularly in support of amphibious landings, but existing gun Cruisers and destroyers were showing their age. A new design was started, employing a new 130 mm automatic gun turret.

Construction and career 
Burny was laid down on 4 November 1983 and launched on 30 December 1983 by Zhdanov Shipyard in Leningrad.

From October 14 to November 14, 1990, the destroyer underwent dock repairs at Dalzavod in PD-77. In 1990, Burny covered 5738 miles.

From January 3 to July 20, 1991, the ship carried out combat service in the South China Sea, based in Cam Ranh, during its combat service it covered 6554.5 nautical miles. In total, in 1991, the ship covered 8222.3 miles.

On April 28, 1994, the destroyer was assigned to the 36th division of missile ships of the 10th operational squadron. During 1996, the ship covered 1125 miles in 27 sailing days.

In August 1998 it took part in the Russian-American emergency response exercises.

From April 19 to April 23, 1999, she took part in the collection-cruise of the Pacific Fleet with the launch of missiles. In June 1999, the ship was sent for repairs to Dalzavod. On September 26, 1999, under the flag of Vice-Admiral M. G. Zakharenko, the ship together with the cruiser Varyag made an exit to the sea; in October, during the celebration of the 50th anniversary of the PRC, it paid a visit to Shanghai; returned to base on October 10.

On April 10, 2000, at 10 o'clock in the morning, an unauthorized salvo from an AK-630 was fired on the ship while turning around at the side of the destroyer Admiral Vinogradov. In this regard, the planned visit to Busan on April 12 was postponed until autumn.

In 2005, the ship participated in the joint Russian-Chinese exercise Peace Mission 2005. In the same year, the ship was delivered for repairs at the Dalzavod.

According to the executive director of the enterprise, work on the ship began only in September 2007.

In February 2013, the St. Petersburg Kirov-Energomash plant started repairing Burny, but this type of repair proved difficult, since the plant had already ceased production of turbine blades, and no specialists remained. On October 24, 2013, the management of the Dalzavod CS announced the repair of the ship's electromechanical installation.

In the beginning of the modernization of weapons in 2014, after receiving a technical assignment from the command of the Navy.

It is known that until the end of 2015 the Kirov-Energomash plant did not perform the necessary repairs of the GTZA.

In 2016, a decision was made to continue the renovation.

From 2019, renovations continue with reduced funding and a shift in terms.

Gallery

References 

1986 ships
Sovremenny-class destroyers
Ships built at Severnaya Verf
Cold War destroyers of the Soviet Union